Miklós Steinmetz (1913–December 1944) was a Hungarian-born Soviet Red Army captain.

His parents were communists, and, after the fall of the Hungarian Soviet Republic in 1919, the family fled to South America before immigrating to the Soviet Union. Steinmetz became a member of the Komsomol – the Soviet Communist Youth Organization, and then fought on the Republican side in the Spanish Civil War, becoming a captain in the Red Army during World War II.

In December 1944 (during the Battle of Budapest), when Soviet forces had encircled the Nazi German-controlled Hungarian capital, he delivered the ultimatum demanding the Germans and Hungarians to surrender. He was killed before the Soviet takeover of the city, when his car ran over a mine on the Üllői avenue in Pestszentlőrinc (today part of Budapest).

1913 births
1944 deaths
Hungarian communists
Hungarian emigrants to the Soviet Union
Hungarian Jews
Soviet military personnel killed in World War II
Soviet people of the Spanish Civil War
Landmine victims